1979 Football Championship of Ukrainian SSR was the 49th season of association football competition of the Ukrainian SSR, which was part of the Soviet Second League in Zone 2. The season started on 31 March 1981.

The 1979 Football Championship of Ukrainian SSR was won by Kolos Nikopol.

The "Ruby Cup" of Molod Ukrayiny newspaper (for the most scored goals) was received by Avanhard Rivno.

Teams

Location map

Promoted teams
Metalurh Dniprodzerzhynsk – Champion of the Fitness clubs competitions (KFK) (debut)
Okean Kerch – Third place runner-up of the Fitness clubs competitions (KFK) (returning after 10 seasons)

Renamed teams
 Nyva Vinnytsia was called Lokomotyv Vinnytsia
 Avtomobilist Tiraspol was called Start Tiraspol

Final standings

Top goalscorers
The following were the top ten goalscorers.

See also
 Soviet Second League

Notes

External links
 1979 Soviet Second League, Zone 6 (Ukrainian SSR football championship). Luhansk football portal
 1979 Soviet championships (all leagues) at helmsoccer.narod.ru

1979
3
Soviet
Soviet
football
Football Championship of the Ukrainian SSR